Parys is a given name and surname. Notable people with the name include:

Given name 
 Parys Filippi (1836–1874), Polish sculptor
 Parys Haralson (born 1984), American football linebacker

Surname 
 Jan Parys (born 1950), Polish politician
 Magdalena Parys (born 1971), Polish writer
 Robert Parys (died 1408), English politician
 Sylwia Parys (born 1988), Polish singer

See also
Van Parys, surname
Paris (given name)
Paris (surname)